New Palestine is an unincorporated community in Clermont County, in the U.S. state of Ohio.

History
An old variant name was Palestine. This site was laid out as Palestine in 1818. A post office called New Palestine was established in 1850, and closed in 1905.

See also
East Palestine, Ohio
New Palestine, Indiana

References

Unincorporated communities in Clermont County, Ohio
Unincorporated communities in Ohio